Son Boricua is a Latin dance music orchestra based in New York City, founded by Jose Mangual Junior. Lead singer was Jimmy Sabater until his death in 2012.

Their debut album was released in 1998. Their music is mostly salsa (Puerto-Rican style) and mambo, both original songs and covers. The meaning of the name - "Son" is a Latin genre (originally from Cuba), and "Boricua" means Puerto-Rican in Spanish.

Discography
Son Boricua (Caiman Records, 1998)
Musical A Cortijo-Rivera (Cobo, 2000)
Mo-Jimmy Sabater Con Son Boricua (Cobo, 2001)
Clasicos 60s (Cobo, 2002)
Fabulosos 70s (Cobo, 2004)

Orchestra Members 
Founder, musical director and bongos: Jose Mangual Jr.
Timbales and vocals: Jimmy Sabater
Vocals: Frankie Morales
Piano: Hiram de Jesus
Congas: Papo Pepin
Coros: Willie Amadeo (coros)
Vibes: Sonny Rivera (vibes)
Vibes: AJ Mantas
Vibes: Mike Freeman
Bass: Ray Martinez
Bass: Ruben Rodriguez
Bongos, congas: Ray Colon

External links 
First disks in allmusic.com
Songs & Albums at Rhapsody

Latin American music
American orchestras
Salsa music groups
Musical groups from New York City